Miroslav Zelinka (born 23 February 1981) is a Czech football referee. He refereed at 2012–13 UEFA Europa League.

Zelinka became a FIFA referee in 2011. He has officiated in 2014 World Cup qualifiers.

References 

1981 births
Living people
Czech football referees
UEFA Europa League referees